Lakshmia sirena is a moth in the family Cossidae. It was described by Yakovlev in 2006. It is found in Vietnam.

The length of the forewings is about 17 mm. The forewings are yellow with a suffusion of black scales and a small brownish spot in the cubital area. The hindwings are uniform greyish brown.

References

Natural History Museum Lepidoptera generic names catalog

Zeuzerinae
Moths described in 2006